A cockatoo is a parrot from the bird family Cacatuidae.

Cockatoo may refer also to:

Cockatoo, Queensland, a locality in Australia
Cockatoo, Victoria, a town in the Dandenong Ranges, 50 km east of Melbourne, Australia
Cockatoo Island Dockyard, an important naval and commercial dockyard in Sydney Harbour
Cockatoo Island (New South Wales) in Sydney Harbour
Cockatoo Island (Queensland) in the Brisbane River
Cockatoo Island (Western Australia), an island in the Buccaneer Archipelago off the coast of Western Australia
USS Cockatoo, two ships of the United States Navy
Cockatoo railway station, situated on the Puffing Billy Railway, Melbourne
Cockatoos (novel), a 1954 novel by Australian author Miles Franklin
The Cockatoos, a 1974 story collection by Australian author Patrick White
Nakia Cockatoo (born 1996), Australian rules football player

See also
Cockatiel